Amara belfragei is a species of beetle of the genus Amara in the family Carabidae.

belfragei
Beetles described in 1892
Taxa named by George Henry Horn